Shermukhammad Kuziyev (born 23 May 1971) is a Uzbekistani wrestler. He competed in the men's Greco-Roman 130 kg at the 1996 Summer Olympics. He was affiliated with CSKA Tashkent.

References

1971 births
Living people
Uzbekistani male sport wrestlers
Olympic wrestlers of Uzbekistan
Wrestlers at the 1996 Summer Olympics
Place of birth missing (living people)
Asian Games medalists in wrestling
Wrestlers at the 1998 Asian Games
Wrestlers at the 2002 Asian Games
Asian Games silver medalists for Uzbekistan
Medalists at the 1998 Asian Games
Armed Forces sports society athletes
20th-century Uzbekistani people
21st-century Uzbekistani people